KUBD may refer to:

 KUBD (TV), a television station (channel 4) licensed to Ketchikan, Alaska, United States
 KUBD-LP, a defunct low-power television station (channel 11) formerly licensed to Kodiak, Alaska, United States